Bettina Hoy (born Bettina Overesch: November 7, 1962) is an Olympic-level equestrian rider, who competes for Germany in Eventing competitions. Bettina competed in the 1984 Summer Olympics, 1996 Summer Olympics, and in the 2004 Summer Olympics.

2004 Summer Olympics
At the 2004 Summer Olympics, held in Athens, Hoy competed in the three-day eventing competition, both as an individual rider and as part of the German team.

After the dressage and cross-country stages, Nicolas Touzaint was leading the field on the third day, Hoy was in second place, France was leading the team event, with Germany in second place as well. In the first round of show jumping, the third and final event, Hoy (the final jumper for the German team, as the best placed German rider) did not knock any fences down. However, Hoy had crossed the start line twice and was awarded 14 time penalties. After Hoy had crossed the start line the first time, the time clock had restarted and Hoy had thought she had the option of circling around again before starting her show jumping round.

The German team protested the time penalties to the appeals panel of the International Equestrian Federation (FEI), stating that Hoy could not have known her real time as the clock did not show her true time and that she could have ridden harder to avoid the time penalties. The decision to add the time penalties were reversed, with team gold being awarded to Germany and the individual gold to Hoy.

However, the British, French and American teams subsequently appealed to the Court of Arbitration for Sports (CAS), arguing that the FEI was wrong to remove Hoy's time penalties from her final result. The CAS' verdict was that the FEI appeals panel had overstated their jurisdiction in removing the time penalties. The CAS also stated that its decision was not based on any matters of FEI-rules, just on formal jurisdictional reasons. As a result, Hoy and the German team lost their gold medals, Germany getting placed 4th, Hoy 9th. Britain's Leslie Law received the individual gold medal, America's Kimberly Severson the silver and Britain's Pippa Funnell the bronze, Nicolas Touzaint finished 8th. In the team event, France won the gold, Britain the silver and America the bronze.

CCI5* Results

International Championship Results

Personal
Bettina and her husband Andrew Hoy, who competes at the Olympic level for Australia, lived for 12 years in Gloucestershire, at the Gatcombe Park estate of The Princess Royal. The Hoys are the only married couple that has ever competed against each other in different teams for the same Olympic medals. In January 2009, the couple moved to the DOKR (Deutsches Olympia Kommitee für Reiterei) in Warendorf, Germany. In June 2010 Andrew Hoy moved to Farley Estate in the UK, and then to his current base in Wiltshire. In November 2011, Bettina publicly announced their separation. She handed her ride, Lanfranco TSF to her former husband, Andrew Hoy, under the terms of their divorce agreement.

See also
 Equestrian at the 1984 Summer Olympics
 Equestrian at the 2004 Summer Olympics

References

1962 births
Living people
People from Rheine
Sportspeople from Münster (region)
German event riders
Equestrians at the 1984 Summer Olympics
Equestrians at the 1996 Summer Olympics
Equestrians at the 2004 Summer Olympics
Medalists at the 1984 Summer Olympics
Olympic bronze medalists for Germany
German female equestrians
Olympic medalists in equestrian
Olympic equestrians of Germany